The government of the city of Miami, Florida is organized under the City Charter, which provides for a mayor-commissioner form of city government.

Organization

City Commission and Mayor

The Mayor of Miami, currently Francis X. Suarez, is the city's executive and is directly elected; the mayor appoints a city manager to act as Miami's chief administrative officer.

Five city commissioners are also elected from single-member districts of which they are residents. City commissioners also must be qualified voters. The City Commission holds regular meetings in Miami City Hall, located at 3500 Pan American Drive in the neighborhood of Coconut Grove. The Commission has the power to pass ordinances, adopt regulations, and exercise other powers. All city commission offices and that of the mayor are nonpartisan.

Alex Diaz de la Portilla - Commissioner, District 1
Sabina Covo - Commissioner, District 2
Joe Carollo - Commissioner, District 3
Manolo Reyes - Commissioner, District 4
Christine King - Commissioner, District 5

Police Department
The Miami Police Department (MPD), often referred to as the City of Miami Police, is the main police department of Miami. Their jurisdiction lies within the actual city limits of Miami, but have mutual aid agreements with neighboring police departments. Art Acevedo is the chief of police. City of Miami police are distinguishable from their Miami-Dade counterparts by their blue uniforms and blue-and-white patrol vehicles.

Water and Sewer Department
Water and sewer service in Miami is maintained by the Miami-Dade Water and Sewer Department.

Other
Art Noriega - City Manager
Victoria Mendez - City Attorney
Todd B. Hannon - City Clerk

Federal and state representation
The United States Postal Service operates post offices in the city of Miami. The Miami Main Post Office, located at 2200 NW 72nd Avenue, is located outside of the city limits in unincorporated Miami-Dade County, adjacent to Miami International Airport.

See also
 List of mayors of Miami
 Miami City Hall
Government of Miami-Dade County
Government of Florida

References

Bibliography

External links
Official website

 
Local government in Florida